Mark Kennedy may refer to:

 Mark Kennedy (judge) (born 1952), American jurist
 Mark Kennedy (Australian footballer) (born 1972), Australian rules footballer
 Mark Kennedy (boxer) (born 1967), Jamaica boxer
 Mark Kennedy (footballer, born 1976), Irish football player
 Mark Kennedy (musician) (born 1951), Australian musician
 Mark Kennedy (police officer) (born 1969), British undercover police officer
 Mark Kennedy (politician) (born 1957), American politician and university president

See also
 Marc Kennedy (born 1982), Canadian curler